The Reckoning: Our Nation's Trauma and Finding a Way to Heal is the second book written by Mary L. Trump about her uncle Donald Trump, who served as the president of the United States from 2017 until 2021. Preceded by Too Much and Never Enough in 2020, it was published on August 17, 2021 by St. Martin's Press.

Synopsis
The Reckoning posits that the United States has suffered trauma from its inception because of its inclusion of systemic racism and its failure to address the existence of white supremacy, especially by Republicans in recent decades (exemplified by her uncle Donald Trump's election in 2016 and attempts to overturn the 2020 election). Trump also discusses the COVID-19 pandemic as a more recent source of trauma and criticizes President Trump's response and rhetoric as worsening the crisis. She also claims that her uncle is only pretending to run again in 2024 to raise money, having previously argued that he would be too afraid to lose again.

Themes
Mary Trump argues that much current discord in the United States is the result of what its "original sin of slavery" and the persistence of racism and white supremacy, a divide that her uncle has aggravated and exploited. As a result, Americans are collectively suffering from a form of PTSD.

The Guardian called the book "A revealing blend of family lore, history, policy and anger casts light on the background and legacy of Donald Trump."

Reception
Reviews of the book have been mixed. The Guardian says "It is a less lurid read [than her first book] but a darker one too. According to Mary Trump, 'we are heading toward an even darker period in our nation's history. Each of us will see what we will see. Our cold civil war continues.' With her second book, Mary Trump offers food for thought – and grist for the mill."

Kirkus Reviews calls it "of value to those pondering what happened for the past five years and whether we can truly heal. She's at her best, and on the firmest of ground, when she lays into her uncle's manifest shortcomings. She says, 'When your motive is not simply winning at all costs but grievance and revenge, you're more dangerous than a straight-up sociopath. Donald is much worse than that—he's someone with a gaping wound where his soul should be.'"

In The Washington Post, political commentator Joe Klein writes: "A great rant can be cathartic, but it needs discipline. Trump is sloppy. There are no footnotes. Too many sentences contain half-truths and gross generalizations, unsupported by facts." The Guardian says, "Mary Trump puts her positions passionately but perhaps she could pause to consider how such agendas play with voters."

References
Footnotes

Citations

External links

Post-traumatic stress disorder
2021 non-fiction books
2021 controversies in the United States
American non-fiction books
Books about Donald Trump
Barnes & Noble
Donald Trump controversies
Trump administration controversies
Criticism of Donald Trump
St. Martin's Press books
Atlantic Books books